Neaera, Neæra, or Neaira are different transliterations of an Ancient Greek name Νέαιρα. They may refer to:

Ancient Greek feminine name
 Neaera (Greek mythology), a name of multiple figures in Greek mythology
 Neaera (wife of Hypsicreon), a figure in Greek legendary history
 Neaira (hetaera), a prostitute in the 4th century BC
 Neaera, the woman to whom Lygdamus addressed his poems (1st century BC)

Genera
 Neaera (fly), a tachinid fly genus established by Robineau-Desvoidy in 1830
 Neaera, a bivalve genus invalidly established by Griffith & Pidgeon in 1834; now Cuspidaria
 Neaera, a slug moth genus invalidly established by Herrich-Schäffer in 1854; now synonym of Latoia
 Neaera, a plant genus from the amaryllis family established by Salisbury in 1866; now synonym of Clinanthus
 Neaera, an ethmiid moth genus invalidly established by Chambers in 1880; now synonym of Elachista
 Neaira, a true bug genus established by Linnavuori 1973
 Neaera media, a species of moth synonymous with Parasa lepida

Other
 Neaera (band), a German Melodic Death Metal band
Character in Russell Hoban's novel Turtle Diary